Sharon Green Middleton (born May 1, 1954) is an American Democratic politician from Baltimore, Maryland who has been a member of the Baltimore City Council since 2007 and its vice president since 2016. During Bernard C. Young's service as acting mayor of Baltimore, and following Young's ascension to mayor after the resignation of Catherine Pugh, Middleton was briefly the acting president of the City Council. In 2019 she was elected president of the Maryland Association of Counties.

She graduated from Morgan State University. She is married with one son.

References 

21st-century American politicians
Women city councillors in Maryland
Baltimore City Council members
Living people
Maryland Democrats
Morgan State University alumni
21st-century American women politicians
African-American women in politics
African-American city council members in Maryland
1954 births
21st-century African-American women
21st-century African-American politicians
20th-century African-American people
20th-century African-American women